Jaroslav Zajíček (31 May 1920 – 5 November 2002) was a Czech cross-country skier. He competed in the men's 18 kilometre event at the 1948 Winter Olympics.

References

External links
 

1920 births
2002 deaths
People from Žďár nad Sázavou District
Czech male cross-country skiers
Olympic cross-country skiers of Czechoslovakia
Cross-country skiers at the 1948 Winter Olympics
Sportspeople from the Vysočina Region